Zurg, or Kufra, is reportedly an extinct Berber language formerly spoken in the town of Kufra in southeastern Libya.  No data seems to be attested for it, and it is described by Benkato (2017) as a "ghost language" that may never have existed.

References

Berber languages
Berbers in Libya
Languages of Libya